The British Soap Award for Best Actress was an award presented annually by the British Soap Awards from its inception in 1999 until 2019. Alongside Best Actor, the award was voted for by the public. EastEnders was the most awarded soap in the category, with ten wins. Lacey Turner is the most awarded actress, with three wins. In 2022, it was confirmed that the category had been replaced by the award for Best Leading Performer. The final winner of the award was Emmerdale actress Lucy Pargeter.

Winners and nominees

Wins by soap

Wins by actress

References

Television awards for Best Actress
The British Soap Awards